Carnforth is a market town and civil parish in the City of Lancaster in Lancashire, England, situated at the north-east end of Morecambe Bay. The parish of Carnforth had a population of 5,560 in the 2011 census, an increase from the 5,350 recorded in the 2001 census. The town is situated around 7 miles north of Lancaster, 17 miles south of Kendal, 40 miles east (bisected by Morecambe Bay) of Barrow-in-Furness and 28 miles northwest of Settle. The town is also close to the Cumbria/Lancashire border.

Carnforth grew in the 19th century through the presence of the railway and ironworks. Due to the closeness of the coast and the hills, Carnforth is a popular base for walkers and cyclists exploring the area. The River Keer, the West Coast Main Line (WCML), the A6 and the Lancaster Canal pass through the town. The M6 motorway passes just to the east, linked to Carnforth by the A601(M).

History 
The name "Carnforth" is thought to derive from its old function as a ford of the River Keer on which it is situated. Over time the descriptive name "Keer-ford" may have morphed into the modern "Carnforth". An alternative explanation is that the name derives from 'Chreneforde' and is Anglo-Saxon in origin, as cited in the Victoria County History of Lancashire.

Much of the history of Carnforth revolves around the railway and ironworks. Vast deposits of limestone located locally made Carnforth an ideal place for an ironworks, as limestone is a key component of the smelting process. In 1846 the Carnforth Ironworks Company established a works, located near the railway station. In the same year a recession occurred in the Earl of Dudley ironworks in Worcestershire, this meant there was a surplus of workers. A number of workers moved to the ironworks and lived in the nearby company village of Dudley (now called Millhead). In 1864 the Carnforth Haematite Company took over the works and production was vastly increased due to iron ore that was brought in by rail from the Furness Peninsula. By 1872 steel production became the main focus for the works using the new Bessemer process. By 1889 this process had failed. Iron production continued at the works until 1929 when it eventually closed down. The site was taken over by the War Department as an ordnance depot and remained as such until the 1960s. From then to the present the site is now an industrial estate housing several businesses.

In the 19th century, Carnforth grew from a small village into a railway town when it became the junction of three major railways. Carnforth Motive Power Depot was located to the west of the West Coast Main Line and was one of the last to retain an allocation of steam locomotives until mid-1968. The buildings are now occupied by West Coast Railways who still maintain and overhaul steam locos in their premises. The concrete locomotive coaling tower is a rare survivor.

With the closure of Carnforth MPD in 1968, Carnforth railway station facilities were reduced. The main line platforms were closed in May 1970 and subsequently removed when the line was electrified two years later, although services still run on the Furness line and the Leeds–Morecambe line (the Bentham line).

From the 1920s to the 1980s Morphy's Mill, in Oxford Street, was a major employer of women in Carnforth. Contrary to its name it was not a mill but a factory making blouses and other garments.

Brief Encounter
In 1945, Carnforth railway station was used as a location for the David Lean film Brief Encounter, starring Celia Johnson and Trevor Howard. Fans of this film were one of the major factors in the recent refurbishment of the railway station, including construction of a refreshment room to match the studio set used in the film. This reopened in 2021 as the Brief Encounter Refreshment Room Bistro and Bar. There are also exhibitions and a heritage centre which is now run by the Carnforth Station Trust. The 2018 novel Past Encounters by local writer Deborah Swift is set, in part, in Carnforth during the filming of Brief Encounter.

Gallery of film locations

Governance
An electoral ward in the same name exists. This ward is smaller than the parish with a total population of 4,439.

Carnforth is in the parliamentary constituency of Morecambe and Lunesdale, represented by Conservative David Morris.

Geography 

The River Keer runs through the north-north-west of the town with the mouth of the river flowing into Morecambe Bay. It forms the parish boundary between Carnforth and Warton. A bridge between Carnforth and Millhead is the lowest road crossing of the river, although there is a footbridge a little further downstream.

Demography
The Office for National Statistics recognises an area described as Carnforth Built-up area, defined algorithmically, which includes Carnforth and Warton. It is divided into two parts: Carnforth subdivision, which includes the Millhead area within Warton parish, and Warton subdivision. The ONS definition of a built-up area includes built-up land separated by 200m from another settlement.

Health service
There is a general practice surgery in the town with eleven partners and four associate GPs. It has smaller surgeries in Arnside, Bolton-le-Sands, Halton, and Silverdale, to serve patients in outlying villages. It is within the North Lancashire clinical commissioning group and patients are served by the University Hospitals of Morecambe Bay NHS Foundation Trust.

There is also an NHS clinic, adjacent to the GP practice, used for a variety of services.

Transport

Carnforth lies on the A6 road, which is served by buses southwards to Lancaster and Morecambe and northwards to Milnthorpe, Kendal and Keswick, including the 555 bus, described as one of the longest and most scenic bus routes in England. The M6 motorway passes to the east of the town, and its junction 35 is on the outskirts of Carnforth, connected by either the A601(M) motorway or the B6254 road.

The West Coast Main Line railway from London to Scotland passes through Carnforth railway station but the trains do not stop there: passengers must travel south to Lancaster or north to Oxenhoime for connections to that line. Trains from Carnforth serve the Leeds–Morecambe line and the Furness line.

The Lancaster Canal passes through Carnforth; there is a marina for pleasure boats. Historically the canal connected Lancaster to Kendal, but it is now closed beyond Tewitfield, north of Carnforth.

Both the Lancashire Coastal Way and the Bay Cycle Way skirt the western side of Carnforth, crossing the River Keer by the footbridge north west of the town.

Education 
Primary schools:
Carnforth Community Primary School, North Road
Christ Church C of E Primary School, North Road
Our Lady of Lourdes Catholic Primary School, Kellet Road

Secondary schools:
Carnforth High School

There is also a public library branch in the town.

Sport 
The town is home to Carnforth RUFC rugby union club,  Carnforth Rangers football club and Carnforth Cricket Club.

Notable people 
The Conservative Party politician Cecil Parkinson was born in Carnforth in 1931 and became Baron Parkinson of Carnforth in 1992.

The birthplace of Rugby League player Robert Wilson, born in the first quarter of 1879 and died in 1916.

Wealthy English merchant, Sheriff of London and builder of Hengrave Hall, Sir Thomas Kitson who was born in 1485 and died in 1540 was born in Warton/Carnforth.

Musician Steve Kemp attended Carnforth High School.

Myers Danson was Dean of Aberdeen and Orkney from 1907 to 1909, he was born in Carnforth in 1845.

Adam Thistlethwaite, born in 1988, is from Carnforth, and is a member of the band Massive Wagons

See also 

 Listed buildings in Carnforth
 Carnforth War Memorial

References

External links 

Visit Carnforth Website – Tourism Website for Carnforth
Carnforth Town Council – Official Website for the Town (parish) Council of Carnforth

Carnforth Ironworks History of Carnforth Haematite Ironworks.

 
Towns in Lancashire
Geography of the City of Lancaster
Populated coastal places in Lancashire
Morecambe Bay